The 1848 United States presidential election in Tennessee took place on November 7, 1848, as part of the 1848 United States presidential election. Voters chose 13 representatives, or electors to the Electoral College, who voted for President and Vice President.

Tennessee voted for the Whig candidate Zachary Taylor over Democratic candidate Lewis Cass. Taylor won Tennessee by a margin of 5.04%.

Results

References

Tennessee
1848
1848 Tennessee elections